Nour Imane Addi (born 10 June 1997) is a Moroccan footballer who plays as a center midfielder for American collegiate team South Alabama Jaguars and the Morocco women's national team.

Early life
Addi was born and raised in Oued Zem.

College career
Addi has attended the University of South Alabama in the United States.

Club career
Addi has played for ASFAR in Morocco.

International career
Addi has capped for Morocco at senior level.

International goals
Scores and results list Morocco's goal tally first

See also
List of Morocco women's international footballers

References

External links

1997 births
Living people
People from Béni Mellal-Khénifra
Moroccan women's footballers
Women's association football midfielders
South Alabama Jaguars women's soccer players
Morocco women's international footballers
Moroccan expatriate footballers
Moroccan expatriate sportspeople in the United States
Expatriate women's soccer players in the United States